"Nothing Human" is the 102nd episode of Star Trek: Voyager, the eighth episode of the fifth season. This was the final episode to be written by series co-creator Jeri Taylor.

Plot
Voyager encounters an energy wave that turns out to be a distress call from a nearby ship. Arriving to help, they find the ship contains only one non-humanoid life form on the verge of dying. They transport the scorpion-like creature to Sickbay, and The Doctor begins to try to treat it. B'Elanna Torres, having learned of how the creature interacts with its ship, arrives to provide advice, but suddenly the creature leaps at her. It wraps itself around her, piercing her neck and other vital organs, creating a physical and biochemical bond between them. The Doctor finds that attempting to pull the creature off will likely kill Torres, and seeks another solution. When he exhausts his own knowledge, he searches through the Voyager databanks and discovers information on the brilliant Cardassian exobiologist Crell Moset. The Doctor programs the holodeck to recreate Moset in order to work out the solution for separating the creature from Torres together, and they develop a rapport with each other. Moset finds a method that they could separate the creature, likely killing it while leaving Torres alive, but the Doctor would rather save both patients.

Word of the Doctor's simulation spreads about the ship. Tabor, a Bajoran ensign, accosts the Doctor, telling him that the real Moset had indiscriminately experimented on hundreds of Bajoran lives during the Cardassian occupation of Bajor, even though these ended up with beneficial treatments, and threatens to resign if Moset's program is allowed to continue. Torres, barely alive, also learns of Moset, and as a former Maquis member that was sympathetic to Bajor's cause, refuses to accept any procedure developed by the simulation. Moset does come across a procedure that should safely separate the creature from Torres without harming either, and after much deliberation with the senior staff, Captain Janeway orders the Doctor to proceed, overriding Torres' refusal.

The Doctor and Moset start the operation in the holodeck, which involves applying a high frequency pulse to the creature's primary neo-cortex to weaken its motor controls. Initially this appears to work but as the operation continues, the effect of the pulse weakens, and Moset insists on increasing the frequency to make it more potent but potentially damaging the creature's synapses, but the Doctor orders him to stop, and instead applies the pulse to the secondary neo-cortex.

During the operation, a ship similar in design to the creature arrives, and it attempts to communicate with Voyager, but this only comes out as a series of high-pitched shrieks. Voyager is unable to provide a comprehensible reply, and the new ship grabs Voyager in a power-draining tractor beam. Though her senior staff suggest using weapons to disable the new ship, Janeway holds firm onto arriving at a peaceful solution. First Officer Chakotay reroutes power to the holodeck to assure the Doctor can complete the operation with Moset. Eventually, the Doctor's treatment works, and they are able to stabilize both Torres and the creature. Janeway has the creature transported back aboard the new ship. It disengages the tractor beam and flies off.

Janeway poses the question to the Doctor about whether they should retain the Moset program, because, although his xenobiology knowledge would be of tremendous help, his presence has upset part of the crew; Torres herself is furious at Janeway for overriding her refusal even though it saved her life. The Doctor talks to Moset privately, and comes to learn Moset considers his Machiavellian methods necessary for Voyagers survival, and that itself requires them to experiment on "lower" animals for the greater good. The Doctor wavers, and Moset tries to plead with him, pointing out that  the Doctor himself has not lived up to the Hippocratic Oath by utilizing all available resources to save a life. The Doctor is not moved by Moset's argument and orders the program terminated and deleted from the computer, explaining he cannot in good conscience use Moset's knowledge knowing how it was obtained.

Reception 
In 2019, CBR rated "Nothing Human" the 18th best holodeck episode of the franchise, noting the ethical questions raised in the episode.

Releases 
This episode was released on VHS, paired with "Infinite Regress".

On November 9, 2004, this episode was released as part of the season 5 DVD box set of Star Trek: Voyager. The box set includes 7 DVD optical discs with all the episodes in season 5 with some extra features, and episodes have a Dolby 5.1 Digital Audio track.

On April 25, 2001, this episode was released on LaserDisc in Japan, as part of the half-season collection, 5th Season vol.1 . This included episodes from "Night" to "Bliss" on seven double sided 12 inch optical discs, with English and Japanese audio tracks for the episodes.

See also
 "Ethics," the fifth season Star Trek: The Next Generation episode that also deals with medical ethics.

References

External links
 

Star Trek: Voyager (season 5) episodes
1998 American television episodes
Holography in television
Television episodes directed by David Livingston